Wyoming's at-large congressional district is the sole congressional district for the US state of Wyoming. It is the third largest congressional district in the United States in terms of land size. The district is currently represented by Harriet Hageman.

History
The district was first created when Wyoming achieved statehood on July 10, 1890, electing a single member. Since its creation, Wyoming has retained a single congressional district.

Voter registration

Recent statewide results

List of members representing the district

Electoral history

2000

2002

2004

2006

2008

2010

2012

2014

2016

2018

2020

2022

See also

List of United States congressional districts

References

Sources

 Congressional Biographical Directory of the United States 1774–present

At-large
At-large United States congressional districts
Constituencies established in 1890
1890 establishments in Wyoming
Dick Cheney